Graham-Brush Log House is a historic home located in the Town of Pine Plains, Dutchess County, New York.  It was built in about 1776 and is a two-room log structure with a wood frame lean-to on its rear elevation.  It measures roughly 39 feet long and 18 feet wide.  It is one and one half stories with a gable roof; the lean-to addition is one story.  The Brush house was acquired in 1997-1998 by the local historical society, the Little Nine Partners Historical Society.  In 1998 it was damaged by an arson fire.

Lewis Graham came from Westchester County where the British had burned his house. He came to Pine Plains because his father had been one of the Little Nine Partners in the local land patent.  About 1776, he built a one-room log cabin without a cellar to which he soon added a center hall with stairs to the loft and another room with a fireplace, all of logs. The log addition was built over a cellar with an outside entrance. The simple lap joining of logs, without dovetails, relates its construction methods to the military garrisons being built at that time to house troops.

It was added to the National Register of Historic Places in 1999.

Gallery

References

External links

Little Nine Partner Historical Society

Houses on the National Register of Historic Places in New York (state)
Houses completed in the 18th century
Houses in Dutchess County, New York
National Register of Historic Places in Dutchess County, New York